The following is a timeline of the history of the city of Pasadena, Texas, USA.

19th century

 1893
 Settlement founded by businessman John H. Burnett.
 Schoolhouse established.
 1895 - Town of Pasadena incorporated.
 1898 - Pasadena Independent School District established.
 1900 - 1900 Galveston hurricane.

20th century

 1904 - Methodist church built.
 1917 - Sinclair Oil refinery in business on former Allen Ranch (approximate date).
 1922 - Harris County Public Library Pasadena branch opens.
 1924 - Pasadena High School built.
 1928 - City of Pasadena incorporated.
 1930 - Population: 1,647.
 1937 - Champion Paper Mill begins operating.
 1939 - San Jacinto Monument erected near city.
 1940 - Population: 3,436.
 1947 - KIKK radio begins broadcasting.
 1949 - Pasadena Livestock Show and Rodeo begins.
 1950
 Washburn Tunnel opens.
 KLVL radio begins broadcasting.
 Population: 22,483.
 1953 - Red Bluff Drive-In cinema in business.
 1960 - Population: 58,737.
 1961 - San Jacinto Junior College established.
 1966 - Pasadena joins the regional Houston-Galveston Area Council of government (approximate date).
 1970 - Population: 89,957.
 1971 - Gilley's Club (bar) in business.
 1977 - Southmore Cinema in business.
 1981 - Johnny Isbell becomes mayor.
 1989 - October 23: Phillips disaster of 1989; 23 employees killed.
 1990 - Population: 119,363.
 1993 - Gene Green becomes U.S. representative for Texas's 29th congressional district.

21st century

 2010 - Population: 149,043.

See also
 Pasadena history
 List of mayors of Pasadena, Texas
 History of the Galveston Bay Area
 Timelines of other cities in the Southeast Texas area of Texas: Austin, Beaumont, Houston

References

Bibliography

 
 C. David Pomeroy, Jr. Pasadena: The Early Years (Pasadena, Texas: Pomerosa Press, 1994)
 
 . 2008-

External links

 
 Items related to Pasadena, Texas, various dates (via Digital Public Library of America)

Pasadena
Pasadena, Texas